Terrimonas arctica is a Gram-negative, rod-shaped, aerobic and non-motile bacterium from the genus of Terrimonas which has been isolated from soil from the Arctic tundra from Norway.

References

Chitinophagia
Bacteria described in 2014